Secundum quid (also called secundum quid et simpliciter, meaning "[what is true] in a certain respect and [what is true] absolutely")
is a type of informal fallacy that occurs when the arguer fails to recognize the difference between rules of thumb (soft generalizations, heuristics that hold true as a general rule but leave room for exceptions) and categorical propositions, rules that hold true universally.

Since it ignores the limits, or qualifications, of rules of thumb, this fallacy is also named ignoring qualifications. The expression misuse of a principle can be used as well.

Example

The arguer cites only the cases that support his point, conveniently omitting Bach, Beethoven, Brahms etc.

Compare with:

In popular culture
The following quatrain can be attributed to C. H. Talbot:

 I talked in terms whose sense was hid,
Dividendo, componendo et secundum quid;
Now secundum quid is a wise remark
And it earned my reputation as a learned clerk.

Types

Instances of secundum quid are of two kinds:
 Accident — a dicto simpliciter ad dictum secundum quid (where an acceptable exception is ignored) [from general to qualified]
 Converse accident — a dicto secundum quid ad dictum simpliciter (where an acceptable exception is eliminated or simplified) [from qualified to general]

See also
Defeasible reasoning

References

Further reading

Informal fallacies
Latin logical phrases

zh:籠統推論